Otis is a surname of English origin and may have been a variant spelling of the English name Oates.

Amos Otis, a professional baseball player
Bill Otis, professional baseball player
Elisha Otis, inventor of a safety device for hoisting machinery, who went on to invent the first passenger elevator
Eliza Ann Otis (1833–1904), poet, journalist, philanthropist
Elwell Otis, an American general who served in the Philippines during the Spanish-American and Philippine-American wars
Glenn K. Otis U.S. Army general (retd.)
Harrison Gray Otis (publisher) (1837–1917), a publisher of the Los Angeles Times
Harrison Gray Otis (lawyer) (1765–1848), a representative and senator from Massachusetts
James Otis:
James Otis, Sr. (1702–1778), American revolutionary politician
James Otis, Jr. (1725–1783), American revolutionary politician
James Otis, pen name of James Otis Kaler (1848–1912), American journalist and author of children's literature
James Otis (mayor) (1826–1875), mayor of San Francisco, California
James Otis (actor), American film and television actor
Johnny Otis, American rhythm and blues musician and impresario
Leon Otis, research scientist and skeptic of Parapsychology research at SRI
Samuel Allyne Otis, American politician
 Shuggie Otis, American songwriter, recording artist and multi-instrumentalist
 Todd Otis, American politician
William Otis, inventor of the steam shovel
Mercy Otis Warren. American writer

See also
Otis (given name)
Otis (disambiguation)

de:Otis (Name)